My Love is the second studio album by Hong Kong English pop/Cantopop singer Janice Vidal, released under the record label Amusic in November 2005. It contains songs in Cantonese, Mandarin, and English.

Track listing
十個他不如一個你 ("Ten of Him Is Incomparable to One of You")
一埸誤會 ("Misunderstanding")
今夜你不會來 ("Are You Coming Tonight?") (Cantonese version) 
口花花 ("Sweet Talker")
"Goodbye" (Air Supply cover)
心亂如麻 ("Utterly Confused")
"My Love My Fate"
大哥 ("Big Brother")
我想愛就愛 ("Love When I Want to Love") ('IDA' TVC Song)
"Never Let You Go" ('大哥')
"My Love" (Interlude) 
今夜你不會來 ("Are You Coming Tonight?") (Mandarin version)

2005 albums
Janice Vidal albums